Front Royal  is the only incorporated town in Warren County, Virginia, United States. The population was 15,011 at the 2020 census. It is the county seat of Warren County.

History 

The entire Shenandoah Valley including the area to become Front Royal was annexed and claimed for hunting by the Iroquois Confederation during the later Beaver Wars, by 1672. Some bands of the Shawnee settled in the area as client groups to the Iroquois and alternately to the Cherokee after 1721. The Iroquois formally sold their entire claim east of the Alleghenies to the Virginia Colony at the Treaty of Lancaster in 1744.   Front Royal, originally settled in 1754 under the name LeHewtown, had been known to European explorers as early as the 1670s, and the nearby settlement of Chester's Ferry was in existence by 1736. The town also had a well-known nickname by the 1790s, "Helltown," due to the many livestock wranglers and boatmen on the Shenandoah coming through the area, who came into town looking for alcohol. It was incorporated as "Front Royal" in 1788.

Rail service was established in 1854 with the construction of the Alexandria, Orange and Manassas Gap Railroad between Manassas and Riverton. This line was soon extended to Strasburg in time to become a factor in the Battle of Front Royal on May 23, 1862, and throughout the Civil War. Lumber, agriculture, manufacturing and grain mills provided employment in the region for decades after the Civil War.

The American Viscose rayon plant, once Front Royal's principal employer, with 3,000 workers at its peak, operated between the 1930s and 1989.  The plant manufactured rayon for tires during World War II and later produced rayon for rocket nozzles for the Defense Department and the National Aeronautics and Space Administration.

Etymology
Several theories regarding the origins of the name "Front Royal" have been suggested.

A common theory is that the town was named for a giant oak tree – the "Royal" Tree of England – that stood in the public square during colonial days where Chester and Main Streets now join. It was there that the local militia were drilled. During drills, a frequent command given by the drill sergeant was, "front the Royal Oak!" The command was repeated and eventually shortened to simply "Front Royal". This theory is supported by a bulletin published by the United States Geological Survey in 1905, which states that the town was first known as Royal Oak, with the current name being derived from the commands of a confused colonel.

A second account holds that when local militia were stationed around the town during the American Revolution, the sentry would call out "Front", to which the required entry password was to respond "Royal". Eventually their military post became known as "Camp Front Royal".

A third version holds that, in early decades of European settlement, the area was referred to in French as "le front royal", meaning the British frontier. French settlers, trappers, and explorers in the Ohio Country of the mid-18th century were referring to the land grant made by King Charles II, then in control of Thomas, Lord Fairfax, Baron of Cameron. In English, "le front royal" is translated to the "Royal Frontier".

The name was in common usage by 1788, when the town was incorporated as "Front-Royal."

Geography

Front Royal is located at the confluence of the North and South Forks of the Shenandoah River.

Climate 
Front Royal experiences a humid subtropical climate, with summer highs in the low to mid 80s and winter lows in the upper 20s.  Front Royal averages 43 inches of precipitation per year, with 24 inches of snowfall per year.

Demographics

As of the census of 2000, there were 13,589 people, 5,425 households, and 3,585 families residing in the town. The population density was 1,464.9 people per square mile (565.4/km2). There were 5,752 housing units at an average density of 620.1 per square mile (239.3/km2). The racial makeup of the town was 88.31% White, 8.68% African American, 0.28% Native American, 0.63% Asian, 0.04% Pacific Islander, 0.66% from other races, and 1.40% from two or more races. Hispanic or Latino of any race were 2.13% of the population.

There were 5,425 households, out of which 32.2% had children under the age of 18 living with them, 46.8% were married couples living together, 14.1% had a female householder with no husband present, and 33.9% were non-families. 28.9% of all households were made up of individuals, and 12.5% had someone living alone who was 65 years of age or older. The average household size was 2.46 and the average family size was 3.01.

In the town, the population was spread out, with 25.7% under the age of 18, 8.2% from 18 to 24, 28.7% from 25 to 44, 22.8% from 45 to 64, and 14.6% who were 65 years of age or older. The median age was 37 years. For every 100 females, there were 89.9 males. For every 100 females age 18 and over, there were 86.0 males.

The median income for a household in the town was $34,786, and the median income for a family was $42,675. Males had a median income of $32,373 versus $24,182 for females. The per capita income for the town was $17,901. About 9.1% of families and 14.8% of the population were below the poverty line, including 15.2% of those under age 18 and 13.2% of those age 65 or over.

Economy

Front Royal owns and manages the town's Economic Development Authority, an independent agency responsible for promoting economic development within the town.

Arts and culture

Attractions 

Front Royal is the home of Randolph-Macon Academy (founded 1892) which features an Air Force JROTC program. Front Royal is also the home of Christendom College and the Smithsonian Conservation Biology Institute (SCBI). Along with these institutions are the two rival high schools, Skyline High School and Warren County High School.

Commercially, Front Royal hosts the Virginia Inland Port, a U.S. Customs-designated port of entry, situated on U.S. Route 522.

Front Royal is home to the  Avtex Fibers Superfund Site. Once Virginia's largest Superfund site, remediation activities at this former rayon manufacturing facility have been ongoing since 1989. The plant, which was built by the American Viscose Corporation in the 1930s and at one time employed nearly 3,500 workers, was closed in 1989 after being cited for more than 2,000 environmental violations over five years, including emissions of polychlorinated biphenyls (PCBs) into the Shenandoah River. The plant's main buildings were demolished in 1997 as part of the cleanup.

The U.S. Customs and Border Protection's Canine Center Front Royal is located in Front Royal. This facility has trained dogs and their handlers in various detection abilities for federal and law enforcement agencies since 1974.

The Front Royal Cardinals baseball team joined the Valley League in 1984. Games are played in Bing Crosby Stadium. Bing Crosby helped raise funds for the building of the original stadium by arranging for his film Riding High to have its world premiere in Front Royal on April 1, 1950. Crosby's initial involvement came about on April 30, 1948, when after acting as grand marshal of the Grand Feature Parade of the 21st. Shenandoah Apple Blossom Festival in Winchester, Virginia, he went on to Front Royal where he sang on the courthouse steps as part of a concert to help raise money for a new stadium. Bing was the first contributor to the Front Royal Recreation Center Building Fund when he donated $1,000. On April 1, 1950, Front Royal celebrated "Bing Crosby Day" and starting at 11 a.m., Crosby led a two-hour parade through the streets in front of a crowd of 20,000 to Recreation Park for the dedication of the baseball stadium. Park Theater was the venue for the official world premiere of Riding High at 8:30 p.m. where Crosby entertained the audience with several songs. During his appearance at the Park Theater, Bing wrote out a personal check for $3,595 to bring the gross receipts of the day to $15,000.

In 1953, Frank Nesbitt coached a Little League team from Front Royal which came in 3rd in the world tournament. Freddie Moore was one of the players on that team, and later became active in Front Royal Little League. After Moore died of cancer one of Front Royal's Little League fields was named in his honor.

The Confederate Museum on Chester Street has many interesting artifacts from the 1860s, as have the museum buildings of the Warren Heritage Society, the Ivy Lodge (c. 1859), the Belle Boyd Cottage (c. 1836) and the Balthis House (c. 1788).

Front Royal was designated the "Canoe Capital of Virginia" in February 1999.

National Register of Historic Places

Within Front Royal, the following buildings, properties and districts are listed on the National Register of Historic Places:

Government 

The mayor and town council are Front Royal's elected officials.  The mayor is Chris W. Holloway, and members of the town council are Lori Cockrell, Gary Gillispie, Christopher Holloway, Scott Lloyd, Joseph McFadden, Jacob Meza, and Letasha Thompson.

Education
The Samuels Public Library is the town's public library. Its history goes back to 1799 as Virginia's second subscription library, in 1836 it was formed as the Front Royal Library Society, Bernard Samuels donated a building in 1952, and its current building opened to the public in 2009.

Primary and secondary schools

 Mountain Laurel Montessori School

 A.S. Rhodes Elementary School
 Blue Ridge Technical Center
 E.W. Morrison Elementary School
 Hilda J. Barbour Elementary School
 Leslie Fox Keyser Elementary School
 Ressie Jeffries Elementary School
 Skyline Middle School
 Warren County Middle School
 Brighter Futures Learning Community
 Mountain Vista Governor's School
 Skyline High School
 Warren County High School
 Chelsea Academy (grades 4-12)
 Randolph-Macon Academy (grades 6-12)

Colleges and universities

 Smithsonian-Mason School of Conservation
 Christendom College

Media
Three radio stations and two weekly newspapers are based and licensed to Front Royal.

On radio, FM stations WZRV and WFQX are licensed to the town.  WZRV is actually based in Front Royal, while WFQX is based in nearby Winchester.  Also, on radio, AM station WFTR is based and licensed to the town.

The Northern Virginia Daily is a daily newspaper serving the area. Weekly newspapers The Sherando Times and The Warren County Report are based in Front Royal. The Warren County Report serves Warren County, while The Sherando Times serves the Stephens City, Middletown, and Kernstown areas of nearby Frederick County, Virginia. The Warren Sentinel is the county's oldest newspaper, dating back over 150 years. It is published each Thursday.

Infrastructure

Transportation
Front Royal is located at the intersection of US 340 and US 522. SR 55 also passes through Front Royal.  I-66 passes just north of Front Royal.

Virginia Regional Transit operates the Front Royal Trolley, which provides local bus service.

Ride Smart Northern Shenandoah Valley provides commuter bus service between Front Royal and the DC area.

The state-operated Virginia Breeze intercity bus provides service between Blacksburg and DC and stops in Front Royal.

Popular Culture 
In James Axler's Deathlands series, central protagonist Ryan Cawdor is a native of Front Royal and visits the town several times throughout the series.

Notable people
 Dana Allison, professional baseball player. 
 Howard Klein, pianist and former music critic for The New York Times
 J. Hillis Miller Sr., fourth president of the University of Florida.
 W. K. Stratton, actor in the TV series Black Sheep Squadron.
 Darrell Whitmore, professional baseball player.
 Emily Thomas, veterinarian and former actress on The Incredible Dr. Pol.

References

External links

 Front Royal Tourism Info
 Front Royal/Warren County Chamber of Commerce
 Warren Heritage Society

 
Towns in Virginia
Towns in Warren County, Virginia
County seats in Virginia
Populated places established in 1788
1788 establishments in Virginia